Baad is a village in the southern state of Karnataka, India. It is located in the Kumta taluk of Uttara Kannada district.

References

Villages in Uttara Kannada district